There Is No Armour is a 1948 novel by the British writer Howard Spring.

References

Bibliography
 George Watson & Ian R. Willison. The New Cambridge Bibliography of English Literature, Volume 4. CUP, 1972.

1948 British novels
Novels by Howard Spring
William Collins, Sons books